"The Legend of Tennessee Moltisanti" is the eighth episode of the HBO original series The Sopranos. It was written by David Chase and Frank Renzulli, directed by Tim Van Patten and originally aired on February 28, 1999.

Starring
 James Gandolfini as Tony Soprano
 Lorraine Bracco as Dr. Jennifer Melfi
 Edie Falco as Carmela Soprano
 Michael Imperioli as Christopher Moltisanti
 Dominic Chianese as Corrado Soprano, Jr.
 Vincent Pastore as Pussy Bonpensiero
 Steven Van Zandt as Silvio Dante
 Tony Sirico as Paulie Gualtieri
 Robert Iler as Anthony Soprano, Jr.
 Jamie-Lynn Sigler as Meadow Soprano
 Nancy Marchand as Livia Soprano

Guest starring
 Richard Romanus as Richard LaPenna
 Drea de Matteo as Adriana

Also guest starring

Synopsis
At his daughter's wedding, Larry tells members of the DiMeo crime family that, according to his source in the FBI, federal indictments will soon be handed down against the New Jersey mob. One by one the capos gather their families, say goodbye to the tearful bride, and leave early. Tony and Carmela swiftly collect cash and guns from different parts of their house; Meadow and A.J. watch. Tony hides it all in Livia's room at Green Grove. The house is searched by an FBI team led by Agent Harris.

Having dinner after the search, Tony explains to his children that Italians and Italian-Americans are not given the respect they deserve. Dr. Melfi, at a dinner with her family and her ex-husband, says a few careless words, and her ex-husband deduces that one of her patients is a mobster. He urges her to drop that patient, who he says is evil. He deplores the way a few thousand gangsters have tarnished the good name of millions of Italian-Americans.

Tony has told Dr. Melfi he might go on vacation and miss an appointment without notice; she understands what he means. He misses one, and the next time they meet, she tells him that, as previously agreed, she will still charge him for it. Angry, likening her to a call-girl, he scatters bills on the floor and leaves.

In nightmares, Christopher is haunted by Emil Kolar, the first person he killed. He enlists Georgie to help dig the body up and relocate it. He is struggling to write a Mafia movie screenplay. The characters have no arc and he feels there is no arc in his own life. He shoots a shop clerk in the foot for making him wait too long. Tony is furious, but then tries to question him about his feelings, and the conversation ends quietly. Chris is envious and resentful that he is not listed as one of those being investigated by the FBI. When his name finally appears in the newspaper, he is thrilled.

Livia tells Junior that Tony is seeing a psychiatrist. She adds, "I don't want there to be any repercussions."

First appearances
 Agent Grasso: an agent investigating the DiMeo crime family
 Agent Harris: an agent who specializes in the case of the DiMeo crime family
 Jason LaPenna: Dr. Melfi's college-age son
 Richard LaPenna: Dr. Melfi's ex-husband
 Jimmy Petrille: capo in the Lupertazzi crime family.
 Angie Bonpensiero: Pussy's wife of 24 years who is considered a "mob wife" and is good friends with Carmela Soprano, Gabriella Dante and Rosalie Aprile.
 Gino: Gino is seen in the bakery when Christopher shoots the baker in the foot; he is played by Joseph R. Gannascoli, who will later take on the role of "Vito Spatafore" in season 2 of the series.

Title reference

 The title is a play on Christopher Moltisanti's name and that of noted 20th-century American playwright and sufferer of depression Tennessee Williams. Adriana calls Christopher her "Tennessee William" [sic] when he struggles with his screenplay.

Production
 Joseph R. Gannascoli, who plays Gino the bakery customer in this episode, returns in season two as Vito Spatafore, a soldier in the Aprile crew. Gannascoli, Saundra Santiago and Dan Grimaldi are the only actors to portray two roles in the series. Santiago portrays twins Jeannie Cusamano and Joan O'Connell. Grimaldi portrays twins Philly and Patsy Parisi.
 The actresses who play Pussy and Silvio's wives in this episode differ from those who play those roles later in the series—neither "wife" in this role has any lines or is credited for her appearance. Pussy's wife from this episode also appears in "Guy Walks into a Psychiatrist's Office...". In season two, the role of Angie Bonpensiero is recast with Toni Kalem and that of Gabriella Dante with Maureen Van Zandt, Steven Van Zandt's real-life wife.
 This is the first episode directed by Tim Van Patten, who would become a regular director on the series.
 This is the first episode to have Phil Abraham as cinematographer.

Other cultural references
 When describing a character with a story arc to Paulie, Christopher mentions Richard Kimble (protagonist of The Fugitive) and Keanu Reeves' character in The Devil's Advocate. Big Pussy later jokes that Noah had an ark.
 A.J. is seen playing the Nintendo 64 game Blast Corps.
 Richard Romanus plays Dr. Melfi's ex-husband, Richard LaPenna, and he tells Dr. Melfi, played by Lorraine Bracco, that American culture is giving Italian-Americans a bad name, citing The Godfather and Goodfellas as examples. Bracco co-starred in Goodfellas, and Romanus co-starred in another Martin Scorsese film, Mean Streets.  
 Christopher's explanation of his sense of malaise to Paulie Gualtieri prompts Paulie to share: the writer "with the bullfights blew his head off". Paulie is referring to Ernest Hemingway, who committed suicide. Hemingway wrote both non-fiction and fiction about bullfighting.
 Christopher speaks appreciatively of Blockbuster, a chain of video rental stores, now closed down.
 When Tony explains the importance of Italians to his children, several Italian figures are mentioned: Michelangelo, Antonio Meucci (when A.J. mentions Alexander Graham Bell as the person who invented the telephone), the founder of the Bank of America, Francis Albert, Sacco and Vanzetti, John Cabot (mentioned by Carmela), Mother Cabrini (mentioned by A.J.), and Meadow snidely comments that Lucky Luciano invented the Mafia by organizing the Five Families
 In the 1990 film Goodfellas, Tommy DeVito, played by Joe Pesci, shoots the waiter played by Michael Imperioli (Christopher Moltisanti) in the foot. In this episode, it is Christopher who shoots the bakery clerk in the foot.

Music
 The song played when Christopher has a nightmare about Adriana and Carmela is "You" by The Aquatones. 
 The song played when Larry Boy tells Paulie about the possible indictments is "Wind Beneath My Wings" by Barbara Lavalle. 
 The song played when Jimmy tells Christopher about the possible indictments, and Tony, Junior and the other capos discuss the situation is "Turn the Beat Around" also by Barbara Lavalle. 
 The song played when the capos pull their families out of the wedding is "Summer Wind" by Robert Anthony Lavalle. 
 The song played when Tony hides his guns and cash in Livia's room is "Welcome (Back)" by Land of the Loops. It was previously played in the pilot episode, which was the first-ever song to play on the show.  
 The song played when Paulie visits Christopher's apartment is "Summertime" by Booker T. & the MG's. 
The Beatles song "Lucy In the Sky with Diamonds" is mentioned by the comedian in the nursing home scene between Junior and Livia.
 The song played when Christopher steals the newspapers and into the end credits is "Frank Sinatra" by Cake.

Filming locations 
Listed in order of first appearance:

 Satriale's Pork Store in Kearny, New Jersey
 Astoria, Queens
 Jersey City, New Jersey
 North Arlington, New Jersey
 West Orange, New Jersey
 Below Interstate 95 in the Meadowlands in Kearny, New Jersey
 Kearny, New Jersey
 West Caldwell, New Jersey
 West Orange, New Jersey

Reception 
In a retrospective review, Emily St. James of The A.V. Club was positive. While she opined that the story with Melfi's family "has a tendency to stop the show dead in its tracks" in that "no one watching really cares what Melfi's ex-husband thinks", St. James listed Christopher's conversations with Paulie and Tony among her favorite scenes from the entirety of The Sopranos and argued that "the series shows it has a certain affection for these characters, these scumbags." Alan Sepinwall also praised the scene between Christopher and Paulie as "remarkable [...] as it illustrates the folly of trying to model your life on your favorite movie and TV characters", but wrote that the dialogue in the scenes with Melfi's family about the popular image of Italian-Americans "grows a little didactic at times".

References

External links
"The Legend of Tennessee Moltisanti"  at HBO

The Sopranos (season 1) episodes
1999 American television episodes
Television episodes written by David Chase
Television episodes directed by Tim Van Patten

fr:La Légende de Tennessee Moltisanti